The 24th G8 Summit was held in Birmingham, England, United Kingdom on 15–17 May 1998. The venue for this summit meeting was the International Convention Centre.

The Group of Seven (G7) was an unofficial forum which brought together the heads of the richest industrialized countries: France, Germany, Italy, Japan, the United Kingdom, the United States, and Canada starting in 1976.  The G8, meeting for the first time in 1997, was formed with the addition of Russia. In addition, the President of the European Commission has been formally included in summits since 1981. The summits were not meant to be linked formally with wider international institutions; and in fact, a mild rebellion against the stiff formality of other international meetings was a part of the genesis of cooperation between France's president Valéry Giscard d'Estaing and Germany's chancellor Helmut Schmidt as they conceived the initial summit of the Group of Six (G6) in 1975.

Leaders at the summit

The G8 is an unofficial annual forum for the leaders of Canada, the European Commission, France, Germany, Italy, Japan, Russia, the United Kingdom, and the United States.

The 24th G8 summit was the last summit for German Chancellor Helmut Kohl and Japanese Prime Minister Ryutaro Hashimoto.

Participants
These summit participants are the current "core members" of the international forum:

Priorities
Traditionally, the host country of the G8 summit sets the agenda for negotiations, which take place primarily amongst multi-national civil servants in the weeks before the summit itself, leading to a joint declaration which all countries can agree to sign.

Issues
The summit was intended as a venue for resolving differences among its members. As a practical matter, the summit was also conceived as an opportunity for its members to give each other mutual encouragement in the face of difficult economic decisions.

Accomplishments
In 1998, the summit leaders proclaimed an "Action Program on Forests" with a pledge to report back on progress in 2000, but there is little evidence of follow-up action or programme.

Business opportunity
For some, the G8 summit became a profit-generating event; as for example, the official G8 Summit magazines which have been published under the auspices of the host nations for distribution to all attendees since 1998.

Gallery

Notes

References
 Bayne, Nicholas and Robert D. Putnam. (2000).  Hanging in There: The G7 and G8 Summit in Maturity and Renewal. Aldershot, Hampshire, England: Ashgate Publishing. ; ; 
 Reinalda, Bob and Bertjan Verbeek. (1998).  Autonomous Policy Making by International Organizations. London: Routledge.  ; ; ; ;

External links
 Official G8 website: Birmingham summit, 1998; n.b., no official website is created for any G7 summit prior to 1995 — see the 21st G7 summit.
 University of Toronto: G8 Research Group, G8 Information Centre
 G8 1998, delegations & documents

1990s in Birmingham, West Midlands
G8 summit
G8 summit
1998 in international relations
G8 summit 1998
G8 summit 1998
1998
G8 summit 1998
May 1998 events in the United Kingdom